Sedum oregonense is a species of flowering plant in the family Crassulaceae known by the common name cream stonecrop. It is native to the Klamath Ranges of southern Oregon and northern California, where it grows in rocky habitat. It is a succulent plant forming basal rosettes of leaves up to about 4 centimeters long. Smaller leaves occur farther up the stem. The leaves are green in color and waxy in texture. The inflorescence is an erect, wide open array of many flowers. The flowers have yellow petals with red-tinged or white-speckled undersides.

References

External links
Jepson Manual Treatment
USDA Plants Profile
Flora of North America
Photo gallery

oregonense
Flora of California
Flora of Oregon
Flora without expected TNC conservation status